Sergei Prokofiev's Symphony No. 7 in C-sharp minor, Op. 131, was completed in 1952, the year before his death. It is his last symphony.

Background
Most of the symphony is emotionally restrained, nostalgic and melancholy in mood, including the ending of the Vivace final movement. However, Prokofiev was later convinced to add an energetic and optimistic coda, so as to win the Stalin Prize of 100,000 rubles. Before he died, Prokofiev indicated that the original quiet ending was to be preferred.

The premiere was well-received, and in 1957, four years after Prokofiev's death, the symphony was awarded the Lenin Prize.

Movements

The symphony is in four movements, lasting 30–35 minutes:

 Moderato 
 Allegretto
 Andante espressivo
 Vivace

The first movement, in sonata form, opens with a melancholic first theme on violins, which contrasts with the warm and lyrical second theme on winds. After a brief development section, the recapitulation of the two themes follows, and the movement ends in a reflective mood with the clock-ticking sounds on glockenspiel and xylophone.

The second movement is an autumnal waltz, reminiscent of Prokofiev's ballet Cinderella, while the third movement is an expressive and singing slow movement.

The finale, in D-flat major (C-sharp major enharmonic), contains an innocent cheerfulness. There is a slowing of pace and the return of the warm wind theme from the first movement, and the symphony ends with the same tinkling sounds from the tuned percussion as the first movement.

Instrumentation
The work scores for the following:

Woodwinds
Piccolo, 2 flutes, 2 oboes, cor anglais, 2 clarinets, bass clarinet, 2 bassoons

Brass
4 horn, 3 trumpets, 3 trombones, tuba

Percussion
Timpani, bass drum, snare drum, cymbals, tambourine, triangle, wood blocks, xylophone, glockenspiel

Keyboard
Piano

Strings
Harp, violins (1st and 2nd), violas, cellos, double basses

Recordings
Samuil Samosud conducted the premiere performance (Trade Union Hall of Columns, Moscow, All-Union Radio Orchestra, 11 October 1952); he recorded it with the same orchestra, using the original slow ending, in 1953 (reissued in 1957 as "Moscow Radio-TV Orchestra".) The first recording with the new assertive ending was by Eugene Ormandy and the Philadelphia Orchestra, from sessions on 26 April 1953. Nikolai Malko and  the Philharmonia Orchestra were the first to record the music in stereo, in 1955.  Recordings using the original slow ending are marked by an asterisk.

Notes

Bibliography
 Berger, Liubov’ Grigor’evna. Sed’maia simfoniia S. Prokof’eva, poiasnenie. Moscow: Sovetskii Kompozitor, 1961.
 Jaffé, Daniel. Sergey Prokofiev. 20th-Century Composers. London; New York: Phaidon Press, 1998.  (cloth);  (pbk.).
 Slonimskii, Sergei Mikhailovich. Simfonii Prokof’eva: opyt issledovaniia. Leningrad: Muzyka [Leningradskoe otd-nie], 1964.
 Clark, Colin. Review of Prokofiev Symphony Recordings (Gergiev, etc.) MusicWeb, http://www.musicweb-international.com/SandH/2004/May-Aug04/Prokofiev_CC.htm
 Ottaway, Hugh. "Prokofiev's Seventh Symphony." The Musical Times, vol. 96, no. 1344 (February 1955), pp. 74–75. 
 Prokofiev, Sergei. Symphony No. 7, Philadelphia Orchestra, Eugene Ormandy, 1953 (discography of symphony recordings) http://www.reocities.com/Tokyo/1471/symphony.html
 Prokofiev, Sergei. Symphony No. 7, All-Union Orchestra ("Moscow Radio-TV Orchestra" in reissue of 1957), Samuil Samosud, cond.  https://web.archive.org/web/20030308094425/http://www.prokofiev.org/recordings/album.cfm?aid=000727

Symphonies by Sergei Prokofiev
1952 in the Soviet Union
1952 compositions
Compositions in C-sharp minor